Farnell County is one of the 141 Cadastral divisions of New South Wales.

Farnell County was named in honour of the Premier of New South Wales James Squire Farnell (1825-1888).

Parishes within this county
A full list of parishes found within this county; their current LGA and mapping coordinates to the approximate centre of each location is as follows:

References

Counties of New South Wales